The Magón National Prize for Culture (Premio Nacional de Cultura Magón) is an award given by the government of Costa Rica, through its Ministry of Youth, Culture, and Sport, to a Costa Rican citizen in recognition of their life's work in the cultural field. It was created in 1961 by Law  2901 and amended in 1993 by Law 7345.

The prize's name is in homage to writer Manuel González Zeledón (1864–1936), who wrote under the nom-de-plume "Magón". It has been awarded annually since 1962.

Magón Prize Winners

References

External links
Premios Magón

Costa Rican awards